St Anthony's Monastery was a Celtic monastery at St Anthony in Meneage in Cornwall, UK.

References

Monasteries in Cornwall